D104 branches off to the southwest from D102 near Malinska towards Valbiska ferry port - Jadrolinija ferry access to Merag, island of Cres (D101) and LNP ferry access to Lopar, island of Rab (D105). The road is 10.1 km long.

The road, as well as every other state road in Croatia, is managed and maintained by Hrvatske ceste, a state-owned company.

Traffic volume 

D104 traffic is not counted directly, however the operator Hrvatske ceste reports the number of vehicles using ferry service flying from Valbiska port, accessed by the D104 road, thereby allowing the D104 traffic volume to be deduced. Substantial variations between annual (AADT) and summer (ASDT) traffic volumes are attributed to the fact that the road serves as a connection carrying substantial tourist traffic to islands of Cres and Rab.

Road junctions and populated areas

Sources

See also
 Hrvatske ceste
 Jadrolinija

External links
 Linijska Nacionalna Plovidba d.d.

State roads in Croatia
Transport in Primorje-Gorski Kotar County
Krk